Tina Keane (born 1940) is a British artist who has worked with film, video, digital media, and performance, and been a forerunner of multimedia art in the UK. Reflecting a feminist perspective, her works have often explored gender roles, sexuality, and political concerns. She has stated that her work is primarily about "identity and play".

Biography
Keane studied at the Hammersmith College of Art and at the Sir John Cass School of Art (1967–70) and received an MA in Independent Film and Video from the London College of Printing (1995–96). She was a founder member of the non-profit women’s film distribution organization Circles - Women in Distribution. Keane also curated and programmed exhibitions and screenings including The New Pluralism exhibition at the Tate Gallery, with Michael O'Pray, in 1985.

Keane has been an important influence on successive generations of artists in the UK as a teacher at Central Saint Martins College of Arts and Design, London, where she was Lecturer in Film & Video since 1982 and Research Fellow from 2003 to 2012. According to Malcolm Le Grice, "During the 1970s and ’80s, the teaching of women artists – including Tina Keane, Anna Thew, Anne Tallentire, Joanna Greenhill and Pam Skelton –was one of Saint Martins’ major contributions to art education. Their influence helped create a lasting shift in the gender profile in British art, and Saint Martins in general maintained a committed concern for gender, ethnicity and sexual politics throughout the Thatcher years.” Notable students who were mentored by Keane include Sandra Lahire, Sarah Turner and Isaac Julien.

Her 1978 multimedia work, She, presented at the Hayward Gallery, London, in 1978 was an early example of performance that incorporated live video and slide projections. Transparencies of neon signs, poetry and images of shop windows featuring mannequins were projected on a wall before which Keane performed, while video of the performance played on monitors surmounted with neon texts. Keane has said that the work brought into play "the actual and the recorded, the shop dummy, and the person, the illusion and the reality"

Transposition, first presented at the Museum of Modern Art, Vienna, in 1992, used the body as a screen with video projected onto the naked backs of men as they glide sideways standing on a travelator. Keane subsequently re-edited the piece into a double screen video installation for the inaugural Tanks programme at Tate Modern, London, in 2012.

In 2015, Keane was one of the recipients of the 21st annual Paul Hamlyn Foundation Awards for Artists, the largest individual awards made to visual artists and composers in the UK. Her pioneering, poetic film, 'Faded Wallpaper', was acquired by Tate in 2018.

References

1940 births
Living people
20th-century British women artists
21st-century British women artists
Feminist artists
Alumni of the London College of Communication
British art teachers